Nusrat Munir Ul-Ghani (born 1 September 1972) is a British Conservative Party politician who has been Member of Parliament (MP) for Wealden in East Sussex since 2015. She is serving as Minister of State in the Department for Business and Trade. She was Parliamentary Under-Secretary of State at the Department for Transport and Lord Commissioner of HM Treasury.

Early life and career
Ghani was born in Kashmir on 1 September 1972, the daughter of parents from Azad Kashmir. Ghani was raised in Birmingham, England in a working-class background and educated at Bordesley Green Girls' School. She studied at Birmingham City University, graduating with a BA in government and politics, and later gained a master's degree at Leeds University in international relations.

She was employed by the charities Age UK and Breakthrough Breast Cancer, and later for the BBC World Service.

Ghani first stood as a parliamentary candidate for Birmingham Ladywood at the 2010 general election, finishing third.

Parliamentary career
Following the announcement of sitting MP Charles Hendry's retirement at the next election, Ghani was selected in December 2013 at an open primary in which anyone on the electoral register in Wealden could attend and vote. The primary attracted nearly 400 residents. In the 2015 general election Ghani became the first female MP to hold the seat, being elected with a majority of 22,967. In the 2017 general election Ghani won 61.2% of the votes, increasing her majority to 23,628.

In July 2015, she was appointed as a member of the Home Affairs Select Committee and served until 2017.

In 2016, Ghani worked with Barnardo's, the UK's oldest children's charity, to undertake an independent inquiry into harmful child sexual behaviour.

In July 2017, Ghani was promoted to Parliamentary Private Secretary at the Home Office. Ghani was involved in producing reports on home affairs, security, hate crime, policing and immigration.

In 2017, Ghani chaired the Government's Apprenticeship Diversity Champions Network.

She is a supporter of Brexit and described Sir John Sawers, the ex-MI6 chief, as providing only "gloom and doom" about Brexit.

In January 2018, Ghani was appointed an Assistant Whip and a Minister within the Department for Transport. Ghani was the first Muslim woman minister to speak from the House of Commons despatch box.

During the 2020 British cabinet reshuffle, Ghani was dismissed from government and replaced by Kelly Tolhurst in the Department for Transport. She had earlier been discussed as a contender to oversee the High Speed 2 rail line construction.

Although she voted for the second COVID-19 lockdown, Ghani was a steering committee member of the lockdown-sceptic COVID Recovery Group, a group of Conservative MPs who opposed the UK government's December 2020 lockdown. 

In September 2020, Ghani "launched an inquiry with the Business, Energy and Industrial Strategy Committee exploring how it can look at the UK Uyghur supply chain." The report outlined a series of recommendations to address the use of Uyghur forced labour in UK business supply chains. Ghani was instrumental in the cross-party campaign for the introduction of the Genocide Amendment to the Trade Bill. 

On 26 March 2021, as a consequence of Ghani's condemnation of the People's Republic of China's treatment of the Uyghurs, it was announced that Ghani was one of five MPs to be sanctioned by China. The sanctions were condemned by the Prime Minister and led the Foreign Secretary to summon the Chinese ambassador. On 22 April 2021, Ghani tabled a Motion before the House of Commons declaring that Parliament recognises that China is  perpetrating genocide and crimes against humanity against the Uyghurs. This motion was passed unanimously. 

As of January 2022, she is a vice-chair of the 1922 Committee. 

In January 2022, Ghani said she was dismissed as a transport minister in 2020 because she was a Muslim. She said that a government whip had told her that, in the Downing Street meeting that decided her removal, her Muslimness was raised as an issue. The Conservative Chief whip, Mark Spencer, came forward as the person who spoke to Ghani and said the allegations were untrue. The Justice Secretary and Deputy Prime Minister Dominic Raab said the allegations were serious and called on Ghani to make a formal complaint in order to allow an investigation to take place.

On 21 November 2022, Ghani became construction minister, the fourth holder of the post in 2022 and the ninth in four years, succeeding Jackie Doyle-Price.

Personal life 
Ghani married David Wheeldon in 2002 and has two children.

Notes

References

External links
 
 

1972 births
Alumni of Birmingham City University
Alumni of the University of Leeds
Conservative Party (UK) MPs for English constituencies
British politicians of Pakistani descent
Female members of the Parliament of the United Kingdom for English constituencies
Living people
UK MPs 2015–2017
UK MPs 2017–2019
UK MPs 2019–present
21st-century British women politicians
21st-century English women
21st-century English people
English Muslims
British Eurosceptics